Baldomer is a given name. Notable people with the given name include:

Baldomer Galofre (1845–1902), Spanish painter
Baldomer Gili i Roig (1873–1926), Spanish painter, draftsman, and photographer
Baldomer Lostau i Prats (1846–1896), Spanish politician

See also
 Baldomero